Allocalicium is a lichen genus in the family Caliciaceae. It is monotypic, containing the single pin lichen species Allocalicium adaequatum.

Taxonomy
Allocalicium was circumscribed in 2016 by lichenologists Maria Prieto and Mats Wedin, to contain the single species Allocalicium adaequatum. This lichen was originally called Calicium adaequatum when it was first described by William Nylander in 1869. In an analysis of the systematics of the Caliciaceae using molecular phylogenetics, Prieto and Wedin discovered that the lichen was one of several Calicium species that did not group with other members of the genus. The generic name Allocalicium combines the Greek prefix allo ("strange") with the name of its former genus.

Description
Allocalicium has a thallus that is immersed in its substrate. It has a pale grey to olive brown stalk that is 8–10 times as high as its diameter. Its ascomata have  olive-brown stalks that form small clumps. The capitulum (the expanded, upper part of the stalk) is bell-shaped and dark. The excipulum (the base upon which rests the hymenium) is 20–35 μm thick, and brown on its outermost parts. Spores have a single septum, and measure 11 by 4.5–5.5 μm. They feature an ornamentation of spirally arranged ridges.

Allocalicium is closely related to Tholurna, and both have quite similar spore ornamentation and capitulum morphology. The relatedness of the two genera had been mentioned in 2003 by Leif Tibell, who suggested that the genus Calicium, as it was then circumscribed, was polyphyletic.

Habitat and distribution
Allocalicium adaequatum grows on thin branches of the species Alnus incana, Populus, and Salix. It prefers locales with high humidity, and is often found along streams in well-lit areas of swamps.

References

Caliciales
Lichen genera
Monotypic Lecanoromycetes genera
Taxa described in 2016